Viola Pitts (September 8, 1914 – April 15, 2004) was a Fort Worth community activist who advocated for her neighborhood of Como, located on Fort Worth's west side. Pitts was often described as a fiery and effective activist.   Also known as "the unofficial mayor of Como"  she helped Como, Fort Worth, Texas receive better funding for the Como community center, elementary school, and streets in Como.  In 2000 she was honored when an outlying hospital clinic was renamed the Viola Pitts/Como Health Center.  When she died she received a letter of tribute from Bill Clinton and a commendation on the house floor from congressman Martin Frost.

References

External links
Resolution Praising Viola Pitts

People from Fort Worth, Texas
1914 births
2004 deaths
Activists from Texas